Death Team is a Swedish indie pop group which consists of Mayka (born Maja Edelbring) and Johen Rafael Tilli. They have released a number of singles and an EP.

Career 
Maja has a background in DJing under her stage name Mayka while Tilli has worked as a film animator and also previously featured in the duo Lissi Dancefloor Disaster. Their debut single, "Shake it Off", was released in May 2014. Their second single, "Fucking Bitches In The Hood", was premiered on the Vice website Noisey on 8 December 2014. It was supported by a video shot in a Canadian bowling alley that was released on 21 February 2015. Their third single, "Dolphin Style", was released on 8 May 2015, and coincided with their self-created Dolphin Awareness Day, made to raise awareness about dolphins in captivity.

In November 2015 the American music magazine Spin picked "Fucking Bitches In The Hood" as the 9th best song of 2015 writing that it's "the most perfectly WTF rap verse of 2015".

In 2016 they performed shows around Europe while working on their debut EP In January 2016 they announced on Facebook that they are starting a record label called Rich Parents. The label has since signed acts such as Ängie and Alexander Wilde. In June of that year they released the single "Jump".

On 20 September 2016, the band released their first EP, titled "Death Team Loves You'. It was followed by the single "Messed Up".

In 2017 they released the singles "Work" and "Weekend".

The band has been on hiatus since 2017, while Maja has been focusing on her solo career.

Central concepts of Death Team
Death Team focuses a lot on some recurring subjects in their interviews, music and presence on social media: dolphins, veganism, money, girl power, yoga, pop culture, the music business, pop music, nail polish, Internet as of the 90s, the joy of creating music and Paris Hilton.

Discography

Extended plays

Singles

Music videos

See also
Ängie - Swedish pop artist discovered by Death Team

References

External links
 

2014 establishments in Sweden
Musical groups established in 2014
Swedish hip hop groups
Swedish indie pop groups
Warner Records artists